†Nerineoidea is a superfamily of extinct sea snails, fossil marine gastropod mollusks in the informal group Lower Heterobranchia.

Families
Families within the superfamily Nerineoidea include:
 † Family Nerineidae
 † Family Ceritellidae
 † Family Nerinellidae

References

External links

Lower Heterobranchia
Prehistoric gastropods